Marzabad (also Romanized as Marzābād and Merzabad; also known as Mirzābād, Mitzābād, and Qeshlāq-e Marzābād) is a village in Dizmar-e Markazi Rural District, Kharvana District, Varzaqan County, East Azerbaijan Province, Iran. At the 2006 census, its population was 165, in 41 families.

References 

Towns and villages in Varzaqan County